Karl Hellmer (11 March 1896 – 18 May 1974) was an Austrian film actor. He appeared in 92 films between 1932 and 1969. He was born in Vienna, Austria and died in Berlin, Germany.

Selected filmography

 I by Day, You by Night (1932)
 The Young Baron Neuhaus (1934)
 Love, Death and the Devil (1934)
 Ungeküsst soll man nicht schlafen gehn (1936)
 City of Anatol (1936)
 Stronger Than Regulations (1936)
 Such Great Foolishness (1937)
 Madame Bovary (1937)
 Togger (1937)
 The Mystery of Betty Bonn (1938)
 Little County Court (1938)
 The Life and Loves of Tschaikovsky (1939)
 Falstaff in Vienna (1940)
 Friedemann Bach (1941)
 The Swedish Nightingale (1941)
 A Salzburg Comedy (1943)
 Heaven, We Inherit a Castle (1943)
 Nora (1944)
 Via Mala (1945)
 Wozzeck (1947)
 Quartet of Five (1949)
 The Great Mandarin (1949)
 Heart of Stone (1950)
 Dark Eyes (1951)
 Such a Charade (1953)
 Elephant Fury (1953)
 Christina (1953)
 The Witch (1954)
 Die Ratten (1955)
 My Brother Joshua (1956)
 Winter in the Woods (1956)
 The Night of the Storm (1957)
 It Happened Only Once (1958)
 The Copper (1958)
 The Castle (1968)

References

External links

1896 births
1974 deaths
Austrian male film actors
Male actors from Vienna
Officers Crosses of the Order of Merit of the Federal Republic of Germany
20th-century Austrian male actors